Athletes from the Netherlands competed at the 1984 Winter Olympics in Sarajevo, Yugoslavia.

Bobsleigh

Men

Speed skating

Men

Women

References
Official Olympic Reports
International Olympic Committee results database
Olympic Winter Games 1984, full results by sports-reference.com

Nations at the 1984 Winter Olympics
1984
Winter Olympics